Two ships of the British Royal Navy have been named HMS Eskimo:

  was a Armed Merchant Cruiser, built in 1910 for Wilson Line, commissioned into service in 1914, and returned to mercantile service in 1915.
  was a  destroyer that served in World War II.
She was sunk as a target vessel in 1986.

Royal Navy ship names